Chris Stapleton's All-American Road Show Tour is the first solo and current headlining concert tour by American singer Chris Stapleton. It is in support of his second and third studio albums, From A Room: Volume 1 and From A Room: Volume 2. The tour began on May 5, 2017, in Alpharetta, Georgia and is scheduled to end on August 25, 2023 in Alpharetta, Georgia.

Background
The concert tour was announced on February 16, 2017. Tickets went on sale to fan club members beginning February 21, with general public on-sale February 24. The tour started the same day that his second studio album From A Room: Volume 1 was released. Brothers Osborne, Lucie Silvas, Brent Cobb, Anderson East, Margo Price and Marty Stuart joined Stapleton as special guests playing selected dates. The 2018 dates were announced on January 29, 2018, with Cobb and Stuart set to return as special guests.

Opening Acts

Brent Cobb
Brothers Osborne
Mike Campbell
Sheryl Crow
Anderson East
The Highwomen
Jason Isbell
Jamey Johnson
Elle King
Nikki Lane
Little Big Town
Lyle Lovett
The Marcus King Band
Kendell Marvel
Ashley McBryde
Willie Nelson
Margo Price
Lucie Silvas
George Strait
Marty Stuart
Drake White
Dwight Yoakam
Yola

Critical reception
Writing for Atlanta Journal-Constitution, Melissa Ruggieri reviewed the opening night, considering Stapleton generated "pure country warmth", and adding that his performances of "Fire Away" and "Traveller" demonstrated "both his versatility and commitment to authentic and unpretentious country." Chuck Yarborough for The Plain Dealer opined Stapleton "actually sings like the love child of Marvin Gaye, Joe Cocker and the Hag. It's as if someone opened a vault and discovered a whole country division of Motown soul", and praised the opening acts Brent Cobb and Margo Price. Reviewers Ruggieri and Yarborough considered Stapleton's solo performance of "Whiskey and You" a highlight of the night. Tulsa World journalist Andrea Eger, who attended Stapleton's first concert since he had to reschedule dates due to a hand injury, expressed, "there were absolutely no signs he wasn’t 100 percent–and he's one of those singers for whom recording simply does too little justice to the quality of his live vocals," while Cleveland Scenes Laura Morrison, who attended a different date, wrote, "his wizened and chest-aching vocals howled to the moon last night just as righteously as they do on his albums." Joshua Tehee of Fresno Bee commented "the singer shined on songs like "Either Way", performed without the band. He managed to cut through the din with a guitar and vocal clarity that is hard to manage in an arena setting."

Carrie Horton of The Boot said Stapleton "managed to meet–and exceed–expectations" during the second night at Nashville's Bridgestone Arena; she also noted "every song reveals a different side of Stapleton's talents", and added, "in many ways, Morgane Stapleton is as equal of a force onstage, bringing energy and a grounding sense of place to her husband every time he looks to his left." Tom Szaroleta of The Florida Times-Union praised Stapleton as a performer, writing, "[...] it was Stapleton, a bass player and a drummer. No fiddles, no pedal steel, no keyboards or backup singers; no place to hide." Kevin Coffey of Omaha World-Herald shared a similar sentiment, saying, "Stapleton played lead and rhythm on every tune, and he did it very well, even busting out some bluesy solos that went on and on." The Columbus Dispatchs Margaret Quamme noted, "many of the songs were compact, but he also managed to weave in long guitar solos without seeming self-indulgent", and concluded her review saying, "Stopping only occasionally for a quick "thank you" to the audience, Stapleton revealed the rich variety behind country music, and its deep connections to other musical forms."

For Dallas Observer, Holly Lafon wrote, "Stapleton's show was refreshingly free of the overglamorized accoutrement of country's current biggest pop stars. He traded fancy hair and flashing lights for a stripped-down presentation.[...] Only three other musicians joined him onstage. It seems to be, as he has said elsewhere, all about the music." Lafon also complimented his vocals, saying, "Stapleton's voice also sounded as pure and versatile as it does on his albums." Grary Graff of The Oakland Press commented, "the production suited Stapleton perfectly. A low-key performer by nature, he kept the focus on the playing [...] The range of his repertoire stretched from stone country to hard rock with plenty of soulful blues in between [...] When he let his guitar do the talking–playing a succession of vintage instruments that had any aficionado drooling–Stapleton was a force to be reckoned with, searing and shredding on songs such as "Death Row", "Second To Know" and extended versions of "The Devil Named Music", "Outlaw State Of Mind" and the show-closing "Sometimes I Cry." Several reviewers highlighted Stapleton showing a "fun-loving personality" while introducing the members of his band as a noteworthy part of the concert.

Set list
The following set list is representative of the show on February 10, 2019. It is not representative of all concerts for the duration of the tour.

"Midnight Train to Memphis"
"Them Stems"
"Nobody to Blame"
"Hard Livin'"
"Millionaire"
"Fire Away"
"Might As Well Get Stoned"
"When the Stars Come Out"
"Was it 26"
"Whiskey and You"
"Broken Halos"
"Second One to Know"
"Traveller"
"I Was Wrong"
"The Devil Named Music"
"Parachute"
"Tennessee Whiskey"
Encore
"Outlaw State of Mind"
"Death Row"
"Sometimes I Cry"

Notes
At selected dates Stapleton performed "Either Way".
At selected dates Stapleton performed "Sometimes I Cry" as the closing number.
During his concert on July 14, 2017, Stapleton performed "Was It 26" (by Charlie Daniels).
During his concert on November 3, 2017, Stapleton performed "Last Thing I Needed, First Thing This Morning" (by Willie Nelson), and "I Ain't Living Long Like This" (by Waylon Jennings) with Marty Stuart.

Tour datesCancelled Shows'''

Notes

References 

2017 concert tours
2018 concert tours
2019 concert tours
2020 concert tours
Chris Stapleton
Concert tours of the United States